Pense is a town of 603 residents (2021 census) in the southern part of Saskatchewan, Canada. Heading west from Regina on the Trans Canada Highway, Pense is the first community with services. Other communities in the area include Grand Coulee, Belle Plaine, Disley, and Rouleau. The current mayor of Pense is Bruce Botkin.

Demographics 

References 

Towns in Saskatchewan
Pense No. 160, Saskatchewan
Division No. 6, Saskatchewan